The Blizzard Heights form a high, elongate, flattish area in the Marshall Mountains, standing  northwest of Blizzard Peak, from which they are separated by a broad snow col. They were so named by the Ohio State University party to the Queen Alexandra Range (1966–67) because of proximity to Blizzard Peak.

References 

Mountains of the Ross Dependency
Shackleton Coast